Wolfgang Heidenfeld (29 May 1911 – 3 August 1981) was a German chess player and chess composer.

Heidenfeld was born in Berlin. He was forced to move from Germany to South Africa in the 1930s because he was a Jew. There, he won the South African Chess Championship eight times, and he represented South Africa in the Chess Olympiad in 1958. Besides playing chess, he was also a writer, door-to-door salesman, journalist, and designer of crossword puzzles. His hobbies were poker, bridge and collecting stamps as well as playing chess. During World War II, he used his fluency in German to help decode German messages for the Allies.

In 1955, he beat former world champion Max Euwe. He also won games against Miguel Najdorf, Joaquim Durao and Ludek Pachman. He never became an International Master—he did eventually attain the required qualifications but declined to accept the award from FIDE.

He wrote several chess books, including Chess Springbok (1955), My Book of Fun and Games (1958), Grosse Remispartien (1968; in German; an English edition entitled Draw!, edited by John Nunn, was published in 1982), and Lacking the Master Touch (1970).

In 1957, after visiting Ireland, he moved to Dublin. In 1979, the family moved back to Ulm, where he died two years later.

Heidenfeld was Irish Champion in 1958, 1963, 1964, 1967, 1968, and 1972.
He won the Leinster Chess Championship in 1965, 1969 (shared), and 1972.
He was in the Olympiad team in 1966, 1968, 1970 and 1974; and in the European Championships team in 1967.

His son Mark Heidenfeld is an International Master, has also played chess for Ireland, and won the Irish Chess Championship in 2000 and 2021.

The Heidenfeld Trophy, the second division, of the Leinster chess league, is named in his honour.

See also 
 Castling#Examples One of Heidenfeld's games

References

External links 
Irish Championships – Irish Chess Union website

1911 births
1981 deaths
German chess players
South African chess players
Irish chess players
Jewish chess players
Jewish emigrants from Nazi Germany to South Africa
German emigrants to Ireland
South African writers
Irish writers
German chess writers
Chess Olympiad competitors
German male non-fiction writers
Sportspeople from Berlin
20th-century chess players
Chess composers